Gerd Bisheh or Gardbisheh or Gerd-e Bisheh may refer to:
 Gerd Bisheh, Chaharmahal and Bakhtiari
 Gerd Bisheh, Khuzestan
 Gerd Bisheh, Haftgel, Khuzestan Province